The 1968 Australian Tourist Trophy was a motor race staged at the Mallala Race Circuit in South Australia, Australia on 29 January 1968. The race was open to Group A Sports Cars and was recognized by the Confederation of Australian Motor Sport as an Australian national title race. It was the twelfth Australian Tourist Trophy. 

The race was won by Frank Matich driving a Matich SR3 Repco Brabham. It was his fourth Australian Tourist Trophy victory.

Results

Race statistics
 Race distance: 47 laps, 75 miles
 Pole position: Frank Matich, 1:14.5
 Number of starters: 11
 Winner's race time: 64:37.3
 Fastest lap: 1:16.5, Frank Matich, (Matich SR3) - lap record for Sports Cars

References

Further reading
 Matich all the way in Australian Tourist Trophy, Australian Motor Manual, April 1968, pages 42 & 43
 Jim Shepherd, A History of Australian Motor Sport, 1980, page 168

Australian Tourist Trophy
Tourist Trophy
Motorsport in South Australia